John James Deutsch  (26 February 1911 – March 18, 1976) was a prominent Canadian economist, who served as the first chairman of the Economic Council of Canada, and as principal (1968–74) of Queen's University.

Born in Quinton, Saskatchewan, and educated at Queen's, he worked in journalism and in government, as well as at the university. In 1947 Prime Minister William Lyon Mackenzie King asked Deutsch to negotiate a trade agreement with the United States, that would have produced a sweeping liberalization of Canada-U.S. trade, had it not in the end been repudiated by King's government. He subsequently became an economics professor at Queen’s, and then the university's vice-principal (administration), before being selected as principal.

In 1966, he received an honorary doctorate from Sir George Williams University, which later became Concordia University.

During his term as Principal, Queen's underwent a substantial expansion of its infrastructure, to meet the increased demands of the baby boomer generation, which was growing towards university enrollment age. A new stadium, a new athletics complex, a new student union building, new residence accommodation, and several new academic buildings were all opened under Deutsch's leadership.

Deutsch, who died in 1976, is remembered at Queen’s through the John Deutsch University Centre (JDUC), the student union building, and through the John Deutsch Institute for the Study of Economic Policy, in the university's department of economics. A large banner, containing hoods from his 23 honorary degrees, is prominently displayed in the JDUC.

In 1969 he was made a Companion of the Order of Canada.

References

External links
 John James Deutsch at The Canadian Encyclopedia

1911 births
1976 deaths
Companions of the Order of Canada
People from Saskatchewan
Principals of Queen's University at Kingston
Queen's University at Kingston alumni
Academic staff of the Queen's University at Kingston
20th-century Canadian economists